The Medes were an ancient Iranian people. 

Medes also may refer to:

 Grace Medes, American biochemist
 Medeš, the Slovak name for the Hungarian town of Medgyesegyháza
 Medes Islands, in the Mediterranean Sea
 Medeș River, in Romania
 MEDes, a Master of European Design

See also
 Mead (disambiguation)
 Meade (disambiguation)
 Meades (disambiguation)
 Mede (disambiguation)